The 1968 Little All-America college football team is composed of college football players from small colleges and universities who were selected by the Associated Press (AP) as the best players at each position. For 1968, the AP selected two teams, each team having separate offensive and defensive platoons.

Two players were included on the first team for the third consecutive year: running back Carl Garrett of New Mexico Highlands and split end Dwayne Nix of Texas A&I. Garret was the AFL Rookie of the Year in 1969.

Quarterback Sonny Wade of Emory & Henry won first-team honors and went on to play 10 seasons in the Canadian Football League, winning Grey Cup championships for the Montreal Alouettes in 1970, 1974, and 1977.

First team

Offense
 Quarterback - Sonny Wade (senior, 6'3", 205 pounds), Emory & Henry
 Halfback - Carl Garrett (senior, 5'11", 210 pounds), New Mexico Highlands
 Halfback - Paul Hatchett (junior, 5'9", 185 pounds), North Dakota State
 Fullback - Lloyd Edwards (senior, 6'4", 245 pounds), San Diego State
 End - Bruce Cerone (junior, 5'11", 195 pounds), Emporia 
 End - Dwayne Nix (senior, 6'0", 185 pounds), Texas A&I
 Tackle - Denny Nelson (senior, 6'5", 250 pounds), Illinois State
 Tackle - Jim Urczyk (senior, 6'2", 225 pounds), Central Missouri
 Guard - Dan Klepper (senior, 6'3", 245 pounds), Omaha
 Guard - Larry Small (junior, 6'2", 260 pounds), Northern Arizona
 Center - Dick Dobbert (senior, 6'7", 260 pounds), Springfield

Defense
 Defensive end - Fred Dryer (senior, 6'6", 232 pounds), San Diego State
 Defensive end - Tally Windham (senior, 6'0", 224 pounds), McMurry
 Defensive tackle - Bill Bailey (senior, 6'5", 265 pounds), Lewis & Clark
 Defensive tackle - Jim Ferge (senior, 6'2", 235 pounds), North Dakota State
 Middle guard - Ron Brown (senior, 6'1", 222 pounds), Tampa
 Linebacker - Bill Bergey (senior, 6'3", 230 pounds), Arkansas State
 Linebacker - Tim Buchanan (senior, 6'2", 225 pounds), Hawaii
 Linebacker - Tom McCall (senior, 5'11", 198 pounds), Fresno State
 Defensive back - Dan Eckstein (senior, 5'10", 180 pounds), Presbyterian
 Defensive back - Jim Marsalis (senior, 5'11", 195 pounds), Tennessee A&I
 Defensive back - Jack O’Brien (senior, 6'1", 195 pounds), Colorado State

Second team

Offense
 Quarterback - Sim Byrd, Troy State 
 Halfback - Frank McGuigan, Arkansas State
 Halfback - Mike Quirk, Moorhead State (Minnesota)
 Fullback - Darwin Gonnerman, South Dakota State
 End - Joe Campanelli, Cornell (Iowa)
 End - Angelo Napolitano, Chattanooga
 Tackle - Mike Antonelli, Santa Clara
 Tackle - Jim Koehler South Dakota
 Guard - Mike Morris, Randolph-Macon
 Guard - Fred Troike, Eastern Kentucky
 Center - Fred Selfe, Emory & Henry

Defense
 Defensive end - Jim Feltz, Wittenberg
 Defensive end - Bud Wiedoff, Northern Arizona
 Defensive tackle - Ken Frith, Northeast Louisiana
 Defensive tackle - Joe Lanzilli, Northeastern
 Middle guard - Lee Patek, Pomona
 Linebacker - Bill Assenhelmar, Alfred
 Linebacker - Glen Lafleur, Southwestern Louisiana
 Linebacker - Calvin Lee, Willamette
 Defensive back - Garry Grady, Eastern Michigan
 Defensive back - David Hadley, Alcorn A&M
 Defensive back - Ron Overbay, East Tennessee

See also
 1968 College Football All-America Team

References

Little All-America college football team
Little All-America college football team
Little All-America college football teams